Saint Luke's South Hospital is a 171-bed hospital located in Overland Park, Kansas.

History
Saint Luke's South first opened in 1998. In 2019, Saint Luke's South completed its 100,000 square-foot Saint Luke's Rehabilitation Institute expansion.

Facilities
Available facilities include an emergency department, catheterization laboratory, radiology, intensive care unit, labor and delivery unit, level II neonatal intensive care unit (NICU), rehabilitation institute, and outpatient care.

References

Hospitals in Kansas
Buildings and structures in Overland Park, Kansas
Hospital buildings completed in 1998